Betim Aliju (born 17 March 1989) is a Macedonian retired football player of Albanian descent.

Honours

Club

Besa Kavajë
Albanian Superliga (1): 2010-2011

FK Shkëndija
First Macedonian Football League (1): 2010-2011

Career statistics

Club
Updated 27 July 2014.

International
Updated 27 July 2014.

External links

References

 

1989 births
Living people
Footballers from Skopje
Association football defenders
Macedonian footballers
North Macedonia under-21 international footballers
Kuopion Palloseura players
FK Metalurg Skopje players
Besa Kavajë players
KF Shkëndija players
FK Teteks players
Macedonian First Football League players
Kategoria Superiore players
Veikkausliiga players
Macedonian expatriate footballers
Expatriate footballers in Finland
Macedonian expatriate sportspeople in Finland
Expatriate footballers in Albania
Macedonian expatriate sportspeople in Albania